Lollar is a town in the district of Gießen, in Hesse, Germany. It is situated on the river Lahn, 7 km north of Gießen. The biggest production site of Bosch Thermotechnology is located in Lollar.

References

Giessen (district)